Symphyotrichum subulatum (formerly Aster subulatus), commonly known as eastern annual saltmarsh aster or, in Britain and Ireland where it is naturalized, annual saltmarsh aster, is an annual plant in the family Asteraceae native to the eastern United States and the Gulf Coast to Texas. The species grows primarily in coastal salt marshes, although in the Ozarks it occurs as a non-marine weedy variety.

Description
The stem, along with its thin green to dark green leaves, are both hairless. The sheathing base-blades of the leaves are ovulate, and the margins are entire.

The top of the stem extends into a raceme inflorescence. The heads open up into bright yellow disc florets that are surrounded by ray florets that vary in color from white to lavender.

Taxonomy
The species' full scientific name is Symphyotrichum subulatum (Michx.) G.L.Nesom. , three varieties of S. subulatum were accepted by Plants of the World Online (POWO), with S. subulatum var. subulatum as the autonym:
S. subulatum var. subulatum
S. subulatum var. elongatum (Boss. ex A.G.Jones & Lowry) S.D.Sundb.
S. subulatum var. squamatum (Spreng.) S.D.Sundb.

The varieties S. subulatum var. ligulatum (Shinners) S.D.Sundb. and S. s. var. parviflorum (Nees) S.D.Sundb., are accepted at the species level by POWO as Symphyotrichum divaricatum (Nutt.) G.L.Nesom and Symphyotrichum expansum (Poepp. ex Spreng.) G.L.Nesom, respectively. , S. s. var. parviflorum (Nees) S.D.Sundb. is accepted at the species level by Catalogue of Life (COL) as Symphyotrichum parviflorum.

Distribution and habitat
Symphyotrichum subulatum is a terrestrial species that will typically grow among grasses of any kind. It is found in salt marshes, pond margins, sloughs, swamps, crop field margins, lawns, and roadsides. It is thought to be especially prevalent in these areas because of a tolerance to saline soils and mowing. It is native to the eastern and Gulf Coast areas of the United States. It is also common across Mexico, the West Indies, Bermuda, Central America, and South America, depending on variety.

Uses
According to the Lady Bird Johnson Wildflower Center, eastern annual saltmarsh aster can be planted to attract butterflies and has value for native bees.

Citations

References

subulatum
Flora of Ontario
Flora of the United States
Flora of Mexico
Flora of Central America
Flora of South America
Plants used in traditional Native American medicine
Plants described in 1803
Taxa named by André Michaux